Keelung Fu Jen Sacred Heart Senior High School (SHSH) is a private high school located in Zhongshan District, Keelung, Taiwan. It is also an affiliated school of Fu Jen Catholic University - one of the top  private universities in Taiwan.

The school shares the same campus with Keelung Fu Jen Sacred Heart Elementary School.

Organization
Senior High School
Vocational High School
Junior High School

Notable alumni
Wu Wen-chien, marathon runner

See also
 Fu Jen Catholic University
 Secondary education in Taiwan

References

1969 establishments in Taiwan
Educational institutions established in 1969
High schools in Taiwan
Schools in Keelung
Fu Jen Catholic University
Christian schools in Taiwan